Deportation of North Koreans by the South Korean Government refers to the involuntary and confidential removal of North Korean defectors by the Government of South Korea in November 2019.

Two North Korean fishermen suspected of killing 16 fellow fishermen defected to South Korea on November 2, 2019. The South Korean Government forcibly and secretly deported the North Koreans defectors on November 7, 2019.

This was the first deportation of North Koreans by South Korean Government since the 1953 Korean Armistice Agreement.

Criticism 
According to the Constitution of South Korea, North Korean defectors also have South Korea nationality; therefore according to South Korean law, they should have the right to receive fair trial.

The South Korean Government has received criticism for the deportation due to the lack of supporting evidence, which was based on just three days of investigation.

The Minister of Unification (Kim Yeon-chul), Minister of National Defense (Jeong Kyeong-doo), and Director of National Intelligence Service (Suh Hoon) 
were charged with dereliction of their duty, crime of abuse of official authority and aiding a murder at the prosecution on November 11, 2019 and later at the International Criminal Court.

South Korea branch of Amnesty International announced that South Korean Government's deportation is in violation of international human rights norms on November 11, 2019.

Human Rights Watch announced that South Korean Government's deportation is in disregard of International Prohibition Against Torture on November 12, 2019.

Office of the United Nations High Commissioner for Human Rights pointed out that South Korean Government's deportation is illegal under international law.

Investigation
Prosecutor's investigation was launched in 2022.

See also 
 North Korean defectors
 Werner Weinhold

References 

North Korea–South Korea relations
North Korean defectors
Deportation
Moon Jae-in Government